Ahmed Ali Sardar was a member of the 4th National Assembly of Pakistan as a representative of East Pakistan.

Early life
Sardar was born in 1910 in Arabpur, Jessore District, East Bengal, British Raj. Sardar didn't receive a format education. He started his business career working as a contractor for the British Army.

Career
Sardar was a member of the  4th National Assembly of Pakistan from Jessore.

Sardar retired from politics after the 1969 Mass uprising in East Pakistan and settled in Dhaka.

Death
Sardar died on 16 January 1980 at Holy Family Red Crescent Medical College Hospital in Dhaka.

References

Pakistani MNAs 1965–1969
1910 births
1980 deaths